Turkey Creek is a stream in the U.S. state of South Dakota.

Turkey Creek was named after the wild turkeys in the area.

See also
List of rivers of South Dakota

References

Rivers of Clay County, South Dakota
Rivers of Turner County, South Dakota
Rivers of Yankton County, South Dakota
Rivers of South Dakota